Tevanik is a 2014 drama film directed by Jivan Avetisyan with Arnold Aghababov, Karineh Khodikyan as scriptwriters. It is an international co-production and was created again with the collaboration of the National Cinema Center of Armenia and Artbox Production House of Lithuania.

Set in the 1990s during the First Nagorno-Karabakh War, is a three-part movie; the first part is about little Aram's harmonious family who tragically gets separated in one day. Aram's entire childhood ends. The second part of the film centers on Astghik. Peace turns to war and she loses her friendship, her love, and her idol. Finally, the third part of the film tells a story of 14-year old, Tevanik, who becomes part of a war that changes him forever.

Tevanik has won over ten “Best Feature Film” awards around the globe including in China, Italy, Poland, Romania, Russia, and US. The film has also received numerous worldwide recognition in addition to winning the Armenian Panorama category, Golden Apricot (1st Prize) at the Golden Apricot 11th International Film Festival in Yerevan, Armenia.

Cast
 Henrik Shahbazyan (Armenia) – as Aram
 Mary Movsesyan (Armenia) – as Astghik
 Hovhannes Khoderyan (Armenia) – as Tevanik
 Sos Janibekyan (Armenia) – as Avo
 Arthur Manukyan (Armenia) – as Gurgen
 Marineh Gabrielyan (Armenia) – as Aram's Mother
 Sergey Magalyan (Armenia) – as Osep
 Karen Jhangirov (Armenia) – as Old teacher
 Vahagn Galstyan (Armenia) – as Vasil
 Narek Nersisyan Armenia) – as Barber's Client
 Satenik Hakhnazaryan (Armenia) – as Astghik's Mother
 Greta Mejlumyan (Armenia) – as Tevanik's Grandma
 Babken Chobanyan (Armenia) – as Commander
 Ara Sargsyan (Armenia) – as Meruzh
 Grigor Gabrielyan (Armenia) – as Badal
 Reina Boudnik (Belorussia) – as Sniper

Filmmakers
 Arnold Aghababov (Armenia) - Scriptwriter
 Karineh Khodikyan (Armenia) - Scriptwriter
 Masis Baghdasaryan  (Armenia) - Producer
 Gevork Gevorkyan (Armenia) – Producer
 Kęstutis Drazdauskas  (Lithuania) – Co-Producer
 Jonas Jurkūnas (Lithuania) – Composer
 Narek Martirosyan (Armenia) – Director of Photography
 Arsen Sargsyan (Armenia) – Editor
 Anton Qeshishyan (Armenia) – Art Director
 Armen Tsagharyan (Armenia) – Graphic Design
 Hayk Israelyan (Armenia) – Sound Director
 Vytautas Kazlauskas (Lithuania) – Visual Effects Arts
 Andranik Sahakyan (Armenia) – Camera and Electrical Department
 Narek Sargsyan (Armenia) – Lighting Technician

Awards, Nominations, and Honorable Mentions
 2016 “Hollywood & Beyond's Film Festival”, Los Angeles, USA – “Best International Feature Film”, Prize for the film “Tevanik”
 2016 “Silver Akbuzat” International Film Festival, Ufa, Russia – “Best Director  of Photography”, prize for the film “Tevanik”
 2016 Cannes 69th International Film Market, France, Cannes - For distribution for the film “The Last Inhabitant”
 2015 “6th International Historical and Military Film Festival”, Warsaw, Poland - Special Prize, prize for the film “Tevanik”
 2015 'The Romania International Film Festival Romania -  Best Film, prize for the film “Tevanik”
 2015 The 2nd Annual World Entertainment Awards, Los Angeles, US, - Best Armenian Movie, prize for the film “Tevanik”
 2014 Arpa International Film Festival, Los Angeles, US,  Best Screenplay – prize for the film “Tevanik
 2014 First Silk Road International Film Festival, Xian, China- “People's Choice Award”, prize for the film “Tevanik
 2014 Overlook International Film Festival, Rome, Italy Jury award for Best Original Work.
 2014 Golden Apricot 11th  International  Film Festival “Best Armenian Fiction” prize for the film “Tevanik”
 2014 Cannes 67th International Film Market, Film “Tevanik” and the project of film “The Last Inhabitant”
 2013 “Baltik Event” Film Market, Films “Broken Childhood”, “Tevanik” and the project of film “The last inhabitant”
 2013 Cannes 66th International Film Market, Film “Broken Childhood” and the project of film “Tevanik”
 Received Special award of Haykyan Awards'' of the Youth Foundation of Armenia was awarded
 Avetisyan was also awarded a gold medal by the municipality of Nea Smyrni, Athens

References

External links
 Tevanik at the National Cinema Center of Armenia
  TEVANIK By Jivan AVETISYAN on cinando

Armenian drama films
2014 films
Films directed by Jivan Avetisyan